Padre Pio is an Italian–German biographical drama film directed by Abel Ferrara and starring Shia LaBeouf as Padre Pio.

Cast
Shia LaBeouf as Padre Pio
Marco Leonardi as Gerardo
Salvatore Ruocco as Vincenzo
Luca Lionello as Silvestro

The film also features an appearance from Asia Argento, who portrays Tall Man.

Production
According to Abel Ferrara, actor Willem Dafoe had suggested to the director that Shia LaBeouf be cast for the film's lead role. After Ferrara held several Zoom calls with LaBeouf, the latter agreed to join the film.

Filming occurred in Puglia, Italy, in January 2022. To prepare for his role, LaBeouf visited regularly a friary of the Franciscan Capuchin friars in Solvang, California. He and another friar visited San Giovanni Rotondo, where the film was also shot, and slept in a bed that Padre Pio had also used. During the film's production, as a result of his spiritual experiences, LaBeouf converted to Catholicism. For the film, LaBeouf also refused to use an Italian accent to portray Pio, despite Ferrara's request that he do so, as the project had become too personal and important to wear a "mask".

Release 
The film premiered on 2 September 2022 in competition in the Giornate Degli Autori section of the 2022 Venice International Film Festival. It received a four-minute ovation, mostly seated, at the premiere.

Reception
On review aggregator website Rotten Tomatoes, the film has a 44% approval rating based on 9 reviews, with an average rating of 4.4/10.

Peter Bradshaw of The Guardian gave the film a positive review, with a 3/5 rating, writing that it is "a weird film...with an undeveloped, improvised feel, like a fragment or shard of something else. Yet there is a background hum there...an awareness of something dark and malign. It is a minor film, but interesting."

Ewan Gleadow of Cult Following wrote that "deep at the heart of Abel Ferrara and Shia LaBeouf’s collective passion project, Padre Pio, is a good war movie," but ultimately he gave the film a mixed review.

Jordan Mintzer of The Hollywood Reporter gave the film a negative review, describing it as "clunky" and criticizing its political themes for possessing "the subtlety of a cartoon for preschoolers".

See also
Padre Pio: Between Heaven and Earth (2000)
Padre Pio: Miracle Man (2000)

References

External links
 

2020s English-language films
2020s Italian-language films
Films directed by Abel Ferrara
Films scored by Joe Delia
Italian biographical drama films
German biographical drama films
Films shot in Apulia
2020s Italian films
Italian multilingual films
German multilingual films
Catholic Church in popular culture